Sclerophrys villiersi is a species of toad in the family Bufonidae. It is endemic to western Cameroon. It occurs along fast-flowing streams in montane grasslands that sometimes contain gallery forest. During the day, it hides in holes. Breeding takes place in slow-flowing streams bordered with trees. It is threatened by habitat loss caused by smallholder farming activities, livestock ranching, timber extraction, and human settlement. It is not present in any protected areas.

References

villiersi
Frogs of Africa
Amphibians of Cameroon
Endemic fauna of Cameroon
Amphibians described in 1940
Taxa named by Fernand Angel
Taxonomy articles created by Polbot
Fauna of the Cameroonian Highlands forests